Abdolkarim Soroush                                  (born Hossein Haj Faraj Dabbagh (born 1945), is an Iranian Islamic thinker, reformer, Rumi scholar, public intellectual, and a former professor of philosophy at the University of Tehran and Imam Khomeini International University. He is arguably the most influential figure in the religious intellectual movement of Iran. Soroush is currently a visiting scholar at the University of Maryland in College Park, Maryland. He was also affiliated with other institutions, including Harvard, Princeton, Yale, Columbia, the Leiden-based International Institute as a visiting professor for the Study of Islam in the Modern World (ISIM) and the Wissenschaftskolleg in Berlin. He was named by Time magazine as one of the world's 100 most influential people in 2005, and by Prospect magazine as one of the most influential intellectuals in the world in 2008. Soroush's ideas, founded on relativism, prompted both supporters and critics to compare his role in reforming Islam to that of Martin Luther in reforming Christianity.

Biography
Abdolkarim Soroush was born in Tehran in 1945. Upon finishing high school, Soroush began studying pharmacy after passing the national entrance exams of Iran. After completing his degree, he soon left Iran for London in order to continue his studies and to become familiar with the Western world.

It was after receiving a master's degree in analytical chemistry from University of London that he went to Chelsea College, (a constituent college of the University of London which was merged with two other constituent colleges: Queen Elizabeth College and Kings College in 1985) for studying history and philosophy of science.
After the revolution, Soroush returned to Iran and there he published his book Knowledge and Value (Danesh va Arzesh), the writing of which he had completed in England. He then went to Tehran's Teacher Training College where he was appointed the director of the newly established Islamic Culture Group. While in Tehran, Soroush established studies in both history and the philosophy of science.

A year later, all universities were shut down, and a new body was formed by the name of the Cultural Revolution Committee comprising seven members, including Abdulkarim Soroush, all of whom were appointed directly by Ayatollah Khomeini. Soroush's joining of the Cultural Revolution Committee has been criticized on two sides. He has been accused by orthodox critics of preventing the Islamization of human sciences and by the opposition of the Islamic Republic regime of Iran to involvement in the dismissal of teachers.

Soroush rejected the opposition accusation. There is not an independent historical research on Soroush's role in events which led to the Cultural Revolution and also his membership and his role in the Cultural Revolution Committee. He has welcomed of such study in his interview with Professor Forough Jahanbakhsh - inquiring into modern Iranian intellectual history.

In 1983, owing to certain differences which emerged between him and the management of the Teacher Training College, he secured a transfer to the Institute for Cultural Research and Studies where he has been serving as a research member of staff until today. He submitted his resignation from membership in the Cultural Revolution Council to Imam Khomeini and has since held no official position within the ruling system of Iran, except occasionally as an advisor to certain government bodies. His principal position has been that of a researcher in the Institute for Cultural Research and Studies.

During the 1990s, Soroush gradually became more critical of the political role played by the Iranian clergy. The monthly magazine that he cofounded, Kiyan, soon became the most visible forum in post-revolution Iran for religious intellectualism. In this magazine he published his most controversial articles on religious pluralism, hermeneutics, tolerance, clericalism, etc. The magazine was clamped down in 1998 among with many other magazines and newspapers by the direct order of the supreme leader of the Islamic Republic. About a thousand audio tapes of speeches by Soroush on various social, political, religious and literary subjects delivered all over the world are widely in circulation in Iran and elsewhere. Soon, he not only became subject to harassment and state censorship, but also lost his job and security. His public lectures at universities in Iran are often disrupted by hardline Ansar-e Hezbollah vigilante groups who see his intellectual endeavours as being mainly motivated by anti-regime politics rather than theology per se.

From the year 2000 Abdulkarim Soroush has been a visiting scholar at Harvard University teaching Rumi poetry and philosophy, Islam and Democracy, Quranic studies and philosophy of Islamic law. Also a scholar in residence in Yale University, he taught Islamic political philosophy at Princeton University in the 2002-2003 academic year. From 2003 to 2004 he served as a visiting scholar at the Wissenschaftkolleg in Berlin. He spent the fall semester of 2007 at Columbia University and the spring semester of 2008 at Georgetown University's Berkley Center for Religion, Peace, and World Affairs as a visiting scholar. In the winter of 2012, he was a visiting professor at the University of Chicago teaching intellectual and religious history of modern Iran.

Philosophy
Soroush is primarily interested in the philosophy of science, philosophy of religion, the philosophical system of Molana Jalaleddin Balkhi (Rumi) and comparative philosophy. He is a world expert on Rumi and Persian Sufi poetry.

The philosophy of Abdolkarim Soroush can be summarized as follows:
Distinction between "religion" and our "understanding of religion".
Distinction between "essential" and "accidental" aspects of religion.
Distinction between "minimalist" and "maximalist" interpretation of Islam.
Distinction between values and morals that are considered internal in respect to Islam and those that are external.
Distinction between Religious "belief" and Religious "faith".
Distinction between religion as an ideology/identity and religion of truth.

Epistemology
Soroush's main contribution to Islamic philosophy is his interpretation of the Kantian distinction between a priori and a posteriori knowledge. His theory is called "the theoretical contraction and expansion of religious knowledge" and is primarily based on Kantian philosophy. Soroush maintains that one should distinguish between religion as divinely revealed and the interpretation of religion or religious knowledge which is based on socio-historical factors. The essence of religion, is conceived by Soroush as independent from experience while religious knowledge is understood as a finite, limited, and fallible form of human knowledge, thus depending on empirical evidence.

Religious "belief" and religious "faith"
Faith cannot be compulsory.  As he told one interviewer, "True believers must embrace their faith of their own free will - not because it was imposed, or inherited, or part of the dominant local culture. To become a believer under pressure or coercion isn't true belief.'" This also means that the believer "must ... remain free to leave his faith."

At Oxford, Soroush was heavily influenced by Iranian philosopher Komeil Sadeghi, to whom he has dedicated one of his books Expansion of Prophetic Experience.

Soroush's political theory 

Soroush's political theory is in line with the modern tradition from Locke to the framers of the American constitution. It portrays human beings as weak and susceptible to temptation, even predation. As such, they need a vigilant and transparent form of government. He believes that the assumption of innate goodness of mankind, shared by radical Utopians from anarchists to Islamic fundamentalists underestimates the staying power of social evil and discounts the necessity of a government of checks and balances to compensate for the weaknesses of human nature.

Soroush's political philosophy, as well, remains close to the heart of the liberal tradition, ever championing the basic values of reason, liberty, freedom, and democracy. They are perceived as "primary values," as independent virtues, not handmaidens of political maxims and religious dogma. Soroush entwines these basic values and beliefs in a rich tapestry of Islamic primary sources, literature, and poetry.

Religious democracy 

Soroush introduced his own definition of the term religious democracy which is now a topic in contemporary Iranian philosophy and means that the values of religion play a role in the public arena in a society populated by religious people. Religious democracy falls within the framework of modern rationality and has identifiable elements. It is in this way that we have a plurality of democracies in the international community. "Religious democracy" is a subject of intense research in Iranian intellectual circles.

Democracy where coincides with certain things, it can be secular or religious. Hence, what alters the hue and color of democracy is a society's specific characteristics and elements. Religious democracy is an example of how democratic values can exist in a different cultural elaboration than what is usually known before. But, in a secular society, some other characteristic is deemed important and focused on, and that becomes the basis for democracy.

In fact relativistic liberalism and democracy are not identical since democracy is not violated when a faith is embraced, it is violated when a particular belief is imposed or disbelief is punished.

We do not have one democracy but many democracies in history. We have a plurality of democracies in the international community. What emerged was that a democracy prevailed in different eras depending on the conditions of the time.

Reception 
In 2008, in an online open poll, Soroush was voted the 7th-most intellectual person in the world on the list of Top 100 Public Intellectuals by Prospect magazine (UK) and Foreign Policy (United States).

Due to Sorush's prominence in the religious intellectual movement, he has been called "the Luther of Islam" by the media, a title he disputes as he argues his agenda is fundamentally divergent from that of Martin Luther's.

Criticism and attacks 
Soroush's "postmodern" ideas on epistemology and hermeneutics has been criticized from a "traditional" Shi'i standpoint by the philosopher Ayatollah Abdollah Javadi-Amoli. 

Soroush's ideas have met with strong opposition from conservative elements in the Islamic Republic. Both he and his audiences were assaulted by Ansar-e Hezbollah vigilantes in the mid-1990s. A law imposing penalties on anyone associating with enemies of the Islamic republic is thought by his allies to have been at least in part provoked by some of Soroush's lectures and foreign affiliations.

According to the journalist Robin Wright:
Over the next year, he lost his three senior academic appointments, including a deanship. Other public appearances, including his Thursday lectures, were banned. He was forbidden to publish new articles. He was summoned for several long 'interviews' by Iranian intelligence officials. His travel was restricted, then his passport confiscated.

At the celebration of the sixteenth anniversary of the American embassy seizure in 1995, Wright found that Iranian Supreme Leader Ali Khamenei "devoted more time berating Soroush ... than condemning the United States or Israel."

Besides opposition from conservatives, Sourush has also been criticized by secular intellectuals who disapprove of the religious aspects of his ideas and argue that religious intellectualism is a paradoxical ideology.

Research interests 
Persian literature
Philosophy of science
Iranian philosophy
Eastern philosophy
Theology
Islamic philosophy

Awards and honors 

 2004 Erasmus Prize
 2005 Time 100 most influential people
 2008 Prospect magazine's 7 of 100 most influential intellectuals in the world.
 2009 Foreign Policy magazine's 45 of 100 world's elite intellectuals
 2010 Foreign Policy magazine's 40 of 100 top global thinkers

Selected works
 Dialectical Antagonism (in Persian), Tehran 1978
 Philosophy of History (in Persian), Tehran 1978
 What is Science, what is Philosophy (in Persian), 11th ed. Tehran 1992
 The Restless Nature of the Universe (in Persian and Turkish), reprint Tehran 1980
 Satanic Ideology (in Persian), 5th ed. Tehran 1994
 Knowledge and Value (in Persian)
 Observing the Created: Lectures in Ethics and Human Sciences (in Persian), 3rd ed. Tehran 1994
 The Theoretical Contraction and Expansion of Religion: The Theory of Evolution of Religious Knowledge (in Persian), 3rd ed. Tehran 1994
 Lectures in the Philosophy of Social Sciences: Hermeneutics in Social Sciences (in Persian), Tehran 1995
 Sagaciousness, Intellectualism and Pietism (in Persian), Tehran 1991
 The Characteristic of the Pious: A Commentary on Imam Ali's Lecture About the Pious (in Persian), 4th ed. Tehran 1996
 The Tale of the Lords of Sagacity (in Persian), 3rd ed. Tehran 1996
 Wisdom and Livelihood: A Commentary on Imam Ali's Letter to Imam Hasan (in Persian), 2nd ed. Tehran 1994
 Sturdier than Ideology (in Persian), Tehran 1994
 The Evolution and Devolution of Religious Knowledge in: Kurzman, Ch. (ed.): Liberal Islam, Oxford 1998
 Political Letters (2 volumes), 1999 (Persian).
 Reason, Freedom and Democracy in Islam, Essential writings of Adbolkarim Soroush, translated, edited with a critical introduction by M. Sadri and A. Sadri, Oxford 2000.
 Intellectualism and Religious Conviction (in Persian)
 The World we live (in Persian and Turkish)
 The Tale of Love and Servitude (in Persian)
 The definitive edition of Rumi's Mathnavi (in Persian), 1996
 Tolerance and Governance (in Persian), 1997
 Straight Paths, An Essay on religious Pluralism (in Persian), 1998
 Expansion of Prophetic Experience (in Persian), 1999

See also 
 Intellectual Movements in Iran
 Religious Intellectualism in Iran

References

Sources

External links

Abdolkarim Soroush Speech at George Washington University, Nov. 2015 (Video)
"Abdolkarim Soroush; Iran's Democratic Voice". Time.
A traditional critique of Abdolkarim Soroush's work. 

20th-century Iranian philosophers
Harvard University staff
Georgetown University faculty
Iranian democracy activists
Muslim reformers
Living people
1945 births
Social philosophers
Rumi scholars
Academic staff of Imam Khomeini International University
Hermeneutists
Iranian political philosophers